Abdur Razzak (23 January 1942 – 21 August 2017) (known as Razzak) was a Bangladeshi actor and film director. He was dubbed Nayak Raj Razzak (King of Heroes), a term introduced by Ahmed Zaman Chowdhury, editor of the magazine Chitrali. Razzak won the Bangladesh National Film Award for Best Actor five times for his roles in the films Ki Je Kori (1976), Ashikkhito (1978), Boro Bhalo Lok Chhilo (1982), Chandranath (1984) and  Jogajog (1988). He was awarded the Independence Day Award in 2015 by the Government of Bangladesh. He acted in more than 300 Bengali and Urdu films and also directed 16 films. He is considered one of the greatest actors in Bangladeshi film industry.

Early life
Razzak was born in Naktala, South Kolkata. His parents Akbar Hossain and Nisarunnesa died at early ages. He joined the troupe Rongo Shobha Natya Dal led by Chhabi Biswas. In 1961, he went to Mumbai to get a diploma at the Filmalaya Film Institute. Communal violence in Calcutta in 1964 made work difficult. That year he moved to Dacca to try to break into the nascent East Pakistani film industry.

In Dhaka, Razzak found work at Abdul Jabbar Khan's Iqbal Films, and assisted in Kamal Khan's Ujala. He then worked in small roles in the films Akheri Station and Tero Nombor Feku Ostagor Lane.

Career
In 1966, Zahir Raihan was looking for someone to play the lead role of his new film Behula. He chose Razzak who was then serving as one of his assistants. Razzak went on to act in films including Abirbhab, Moynamoti, Taka Ana Pai, Dorpochurno and Jibon Theke Neya (1970). After the 1971 Liberation War he continued working on the films Manusher Mon, Ora Egaro Jon and Osru Diye Lekha.

Razzak got his major breakthrough by acting in the action film Rongbaj (1974), directed by Zahirul Haq.

Razzak acted in leading roles with many prominent actors and actresses, including Anwar Hossain, Bulbul Ahmed, Sohel Rana, Ilias Kanchan, Shuchanda, Shabana, Bobita, Kabori, Sujata, Shabnam and others. He appeared in a number of films opposite actress Shabana.

Razzak went on to make more than 300 appearances in Bengali and Urdu movies.

Razzak made his directorial debut in 1977 with the film Ononto Prem. He created his own production company Rajlokkhi Productions . He went on to become the first Bangladeshi actor to be a UNFPA Goodwill Ambassador. He later founded the Bangladesh Film Artistes' Association.

Personal life 
Razzak was married to Khairunnesa (nicknamed Laxmi). Together they had three sons, Bapparaj, Bappi, and Samrat, and two daughters, Nasrin Pasha and Afrin Alam. He died on 21 August 2017 in Dhaka.

Filmography

Awards and achievements

Film

Other

References

External links
 The Beginning of Super Star – Nayakraaj Razzak The Legendary Actor
 

1942 births
2017 deaths
Bengali male actors
People from Kolkata
Male actors in Bengali cinema
Male actors from Kolkata
Bangladeshi male film actors
Recipients of the Independence Day Award
National Film Award (Bangladesh) for Lifetime Achievement recipients
21st-century Bangladeshi male actors
20th-century Bangladeshi male actors
Burials at Banani Graveyard
Meril-Prothom Alo Lifetime Achievement Award winners
Best Actor National Film Award (Bangladesh) winners